Azteca beltii is a species of ant in the genus Azteca. Described by Carlo Emery in 1893, the species is endemic to North America and South America.

References

Azteca (genus)
Hymenoptera of North America
Hymenoptera of South America
Insects described in 1893